The Lancaster Arts Hotel is a hotel in Lancaster, Pennsylvania, housed in a historic tobacco warehouse.

Originally, the hotel site was built in the 1880s as a tobacco warehouse and was used that way until 1945.  It then was used by a paper and twine business as well as an electronics business before being transformed into the hotel.  The hotel is listed on the National Register of Historic Places as a contributing property to the Harrisburg Avenue Tobacco Historic District. Lancaster Arts Hotel is a member of Historic Hotels of America, the official program of the National Trust for Historic Preservation.

The hotel also has an art gallery featuring rotating exhibitions by regional artists.  Included in the gallery is a room paying homage to Lancaster sculptor Blanche Nevin whose sculpture of Peter Muhlenberg is housed in the National Statuary Hall Collection at the U.S. Capitol Building.  Another room features the work of Watercolor Painter Charles Demuth.
Other artists who have been exhibited at the hotel include Warren Rohrer and David Brumbach.

Further reading

References

External links 
 Lancaster Arts Hotel

National Register of Historic Places in Lancaster, Pennsylvania
Buildings and structures in Lancaster, Pennsylvania
Industrial buildings completed in 1881
Hotels in Pennsylvania
Hotels established in 2006
Historic district contributing properties in Pennsylvania
Tobacco buildings in the United States
Commercial buildings on the National Register of Historic Places in Pennsylvania
1881 establishments in Pennsylvania
Historic Hotels of America